Antonius Felix (possibly Tiberius Claudius Antonius Felix, in Greek: ὁ Φῆλιξ; born circa 5–10) was the 4th Roman procurator of Judea Province in 52–60, in succession to Ventidius Cumanus.

Life
Felix was the younger brother of the Greek freedman Marcus Antonius Pallas. Pallas served as a secretary of the treasury during the reign of the Emperor Claudius. Felix was a Greek freedman – either of Claudius, according to which theory Josephus (Antiq. xx. 7) calls him Claudius Felix, or of Claudius's mother, Antonia Minor, a daughter of Triumvir Mark Antony to Octavia Minor and niece of Emperor Augustus. According to Tacitus, Pallas and Felix descended from the Greek Kings of Arcadia.

Procurator of Judaea
Felix became the procurator by the petition of his brother. Felix's cruelty, coupled with his accessibility to bribes (see Book of Acts ), led to a great increase of crime in Judaea. The period of his rule was marked by internal feuds and disturbances, which he put down with severity.

In 58, Felix hired assassins to murder Jonathan, the High Priest, shortly after the latter took office. Jonathan had often criticized Felix about governing the Jewish affairs, and threatened to report to Caesar if Felix did not do well because Jonathan was the one who made recommendation to Caesar to send Felix to be the procurator of Judea. Felix persuaded one of Jonathan's most trusted friends, Doras, a citizen of Jerusalem, to hire robbers to kill Jonathan by promising to give him a large sum of money. Doras arranged for some hired men to mingle with the worshippers in the Temple in Jerusalem, while they hid daggers under their garments. These assassins succeeded in killing Jonathan during a Jewish festival and were never caught.

According to the Acts of the Apostles, after Paul the Apostle was arrested in Jerusalem and rescued from a plot against his life, the local Roman chiliarch Claudius Lysias transferred him to Caesarea, where he stood trial before Felix. On at least one further occasion Felix and his wife Drusilla heard Paul discourse, and later on frequently sent for Paul and talked with him. However, his actual desire was to receive a bribe from Paul, a request that the Apostle didn't give into. When Felix was succeeded as procurator, having already detained Paul for two years, he left him imprisoned as a favor to the Jews (Acts 24:27).

Upon returning to Rome, Felix was accused of using a dispute between the Jews and Syrians of Caesarea as a pretext to slay and plunder the inhabitants, but through the intercession of his brother, the freedman Pallas, who had great influence with the Emperor Nero, he escaped unpunished. 

Porcius Festus succeeded him as procurator of Judea. Many historians believe that Felix may have had tuberculosis (like many other Romans), and that this was the cause of his death.

Marriages and issues

Felix married three times. His first wife was Drusilla of Mauretania, probably the daughter of Ptolemy of Mauretania and Julia Urania. Felix's second wife was the Judean Drusilla of Judea, daughter of Herod Agrippa I and Cypros. Drusilla of Judea divorced Gaius Julius Azizus, King of Emesa to marry Felix. The couple had a son, Marcus Antonius Agrippa, who died, along with many of the inhabitants of Pompeii and Herculaneum, in the eruption of Mount Vesuvius on 24 August 79. Antonia Agrippina (whose name was found in graffiti in a Royal Tomb in Egypt) may have been a granddaughter from Agrippa. His third wife's name is not attested. A man named Lucius Anneius Domitius Proculus is described in an inscription as the great-grandson of Felix, his grandmother is named as Antonia Clementiana, presumably Felix's daughter. Another inscription names a Tiberius Claudius (with a missing cognomen) who was in some way associated with a Titus Mucius Clemens.

Marcus Antonius Fronto Salvianus (a quaestor) and his son Marcus Antonius Felix Magnus (a high priest in 225) are possible descendants as well.

See also
 Prefects, Procurators, and Legates of Roman Judaea
 List of biblical figures identified in extra-biblical sources
 Roman Procurator coinage

References

Further reading
 Tacitus, Annals, xii. 54, Histories v. 9
 Suetonius, Claudius, 28
 Emil Schürer, History of the Jewish People (1890–1891)
 
 commentaries on the Acts of the Apostles
 Sir W. M. Ramsay, St Paul the Traveller
 Carl von Weizsacker, Apostolic Age (Eng. trans., 1894)
 Jewish Encyclopedia: FELIX (ANTONIUS FELIX)
 https://web.archive.org/web/20040530071028/http://www.tyndale.cam.ac.uk/Egypt/ptolemies/ptolemies_selene_ii.htm

External links
 Livius.org: Marcus Antonius Felix
 Roman coinage of Felix can be seen under Roman Procurators at 

 
 
 
 
 

Emperor's slaves and freedmen
Roman governors of Judaea
1st-century Greek people
People in Acts of the Apostles
1st-century Romans
1st-century Roman governors of Judaea
Felix
Felix, Antonius